Ahad Beyglu (also Romanized as Aḩad Beyglū) is a village in Pain Barzand Rural District, Anguti District, Germi County, Ardabil Province, Iran. At the 2006 census, its population was 21, in 4 families.

References 

Towns and villages in Germi County